John William Kirton (18 July 1871 – 13 March 1939) was an English professional footballer who made 45 appearances in the Football League playing for Lincoln City and Small Heath. He played as an outside left.

Kirton was born in Hulme, which was then in Lancashire. He played for Glossop North End and Oldham County of the Combination before joining Football League Second Division club Lincoln City in May 1896. From then on, he changed club at the end of each season. With Small Heath in the Second Division, he created many of Walter Abbott's 19 goals in the 1897–98 season. His next move was to Swindon Town of the Southern League, then First Division club Sunderland, where he never achieved a first-team place. A return to Swindon preceded a final move in the 1901 close season, this time to Millwall Athletic, also of the Southern League.

He died in Kilburn, London, in 1939 at the age of 67.

References

1871 births
1939 deaths
People from Hulme
English footballers
Association football wingers
Glossop North End A.F.C. players
Oldham County F.C. players
Lincoln City F.C. players
Birmingham City F.C. players
Swindon Town F.C. players
Sunderland A.F.C. players
Millwall F.C. players
English Football League players
Southern Football League players